Neil Oliver Staebler (July 11, 1905 – December 8, 2000) was an American politician from the U.S. state of Michigan.

Staebler had German ancestry. He was born in Ann Arbor, Michigan and graduated from Ann Arbor High School in 1922. He received a B.A. from the University of Michigan at Ann Arbor in 1926. He served on the staff of the Office of Price Administration, 1942–1943, and in the United States Navy, 1943–1945. He was chairman, of the Michigan state Democratic central committee, 1950–1961 and a member of the Democratic National Committee, 1961–1964 and 1965–1968. He was a visiting professor at the University of Massachusetts in 1962. He was a delegate to the Democratic National Convention from Michigan in 1952, 1956, 1960, 1964, and 1968.

Following the 1960 census, Michigan gained one additional seat in Congress due to reapportionment. Despite this change, the state legislature did not create the new 19th district in time for the 1962 elections, so Staebler was elected as an at-large candidate from the Democratic Party to represent Michigan in the 88th Congress, serving from January 3, 1963 to January 3, 1965. He did not pursue reelection in 1964, but instead unsuccessfully challenged incumbent Republican Governor of Michigan George W. Romney.

He was a member of the Federal Election Commission from April 1975 to October 1978. Staebler died in Ann Arbor from the effects of Alzheimer's disease.

Family
Staebler's father, Edward W. Staebler, was mayor of Ann Arbor from 1927 to 1931.

Staebler's grandson, Ned Staebler, is the chief executive of TechTown, a high-tech business incubator in Detroit, and was a candidate in the primary for Michigan state house of representatives in the 53rd District in 2010.

References

Sources

 U.S. Representatives 1837-2003, Michigan Manual 2003-2004

1905 births
2000 deaths
American people of German descent
Deaths from Alzheimer's disease
Deaths from dementia in Michigan
Democratic Party members of the United States House of Representatives from Michigan
Members of the Federal Election Commission
Politicians from Ann Arbor, Michigan
University of Massachusetts Amherst faculty
University of Michigan alumni
20th-century American politicians
Ford administration personnel
Carter administration personnel